Gauss Research Laboratory, Inc. is the corporation in charge of managing .pr, Puerto Rico's country code top-level domain, and is responsible for providing a stable and secure management of the domain. The company was incorporated on 17 November 2006.

External links 
 Gauss Research Laboratory, Inc. (archived)
 Gauss Research Foundation, Inc. (archived)
 Puerto Rico Network Information Center
 IANA .pr whois information

Domain Name System
Internet in the United States